Tatiana Stefanidou (born April 18, 1970 in Athens) is a Greek television host  and journalist on Greek television.

Personal life
In 1995, Stefanidou married entrepreneur Panagiotis Stavropoulos. They separated in 1998 but their divorce published in 2002. 
In 1998, Stefanidou began dating journalist Nikos Evangelatos. In 2003, they married. Together, they have two children: a son Nikolas (born 1999) and a daughter Lydia (born 2004).

Career

Stefanidou began her career as a journalist, working for Hellenic Broadcasting Corporation. Later, she co-hosted ANT1's morning show Kalimera Ellada with Yorgos Papadakis and was a newscaster on the same TV station for a period. She has worked for Alpha TV, Tempo TV, Alter Channel and ANT1, presenting tabloid talk shows, like Alter's Yialinos Tihos (2001), Fyllo ke Ftero (2002) and Me to Ganti (2003), and ANT1's Apoklistika (2004) and Apokalypsi Tora (2005). All these shows, have had mediocre ratings due to their overly scandalous topics. Perhaps the most notorious topic was digging the garbage of celebrities and then commenting on the cost of the products which were found in it.

From September 2006 to June 2010, Stefanidou hosted the talk show Axizi Na to Dis, which aired on ANT1.

She has also hosted ANT1's Fame Story and Big Brother reality shows and has, twice, been the presenter of ANT1's Star Hellas beauty pageants in 2005 and 2006, something which provoked doubts as to whether she is a journalist or TV host.

In July 2010, it was announced that Stefanidou had signed with Star Channel to present a daily show. The shows were 3 and called "Mila", "Mia" and Axizi na to Zeis".

In 2015 until 2018, she presented on Epsilon TV a daily show called "Tatiana Live".

From Fall 2018 until today, she presents on Skai TV the show "Mazi sou". The show was aired daily in 2018-19 season and it was changed to weekends in 2019-20.

Trivia
Stefanidou is the daughter of the retired basketballer Mimis Stefanidis, former of Panellinios BC, Olimpia (Stefanel) Milan and the Greek national basketball team during the 1950s.
For many years ballet has been claimed to be her main interest.

Filmography

Television

References

External links
Fan Club

Greek television journalists
Greek television presenters
Greek women journalists
Greek women television presenters
Greek television personalities
Mass media people from Athens
1970 births
Living people